In mathematics, the Langlands–Deligne local constant, also known as the local epsilon factor or local Artin root number (up to an elementary real function of s), is an elementary function associated with a representation of the Weil group of a local field. The functional equation
L(ρ,s) = ε(ρ,s)L(ρ∨,1−s)
of an Artin L-function has an elementary function ε(ρ,s) appearing in it, equal to a constant called the  Artin root number times an elementary real function of s, and Langlands discovered that ε(ρ,s) can be written in a canonical way as a product
ε(ρ,s) = Π ε(ρv, s, ψv)
of local constants ε(ρv, s, ψv) associated to primes v.

Tate proved the existence of the local constants in the case that ρ is 1-dimensional in Tate's thesis.
 proved the existence of the local constant ε(ρv, s, ψv) up to sign.
The original proof of the existence of the local constants by  used local methods and was rather long and complicated, and never published.  later discovered a simpler proof using global methods.

Properties

The local constants ε(ρ, s, ψE) depend on a representation ρ of the Weil group and a choice of character ψE of the additive group of E. They satisfy the following conditions:
If ρ is 1-dimensional then ε(ρ, s, ψE) is the constant associated to it by Tate's thesis as the constant in the functional equation of the local L-function.
 ε(ρ1⊕ρ2, s, ψE) = ε(ρ1, s, ψE)ε(ρ2, s, ψE).   As a result,   ε(ρ, s, ψE) can also be defined for virtual representations ρ.
If ρ is a virtual representation of dimension 0 and E contains K then ε(ρ, s, ψE) = ε(IndE/Kρ, s, ψK)

Brauer's theorem on induced characters implies that these three properties characterize the local constants.

 showed that the local constants are trivial for real (orthogonal) representations of the Weil group.

Notational conventions

There are several different conventions for denoting the local constants.
The parameter s is redundant and can be combined with the representation ρ, because  ε(ρ, s, ψE) =  ε(ρ⊗||s, 0, ψE) for a suitable character ||.
Deligne includes an extra parameter dx consisting of a choice of Haar measure on the local field. Other conventions omit this parameter by fixing a choice of Haar measure: either the Haar measure that is self dual with respect to ψ (used by Langlands), or the Haar measure that gives the integers of E measure 1. These different conventions differ by elementary terms that are positive real numbers.

References

External links

Representation theory
Zeta and L-functions
Class field theory